This is a list of seasons completed by the Penn State Nittany Lions men's basketball program.

Seasons

References

Penn State
Penn State Nittany Lions basketball seasons